The following is a list of characters that first appeared in the BBC soap opera EastEnders in 1985, by order of first appearance. They were all introduced by executive producer Julia Smith. The first episode of EastEnders was broadcast on 19 February 1985, and twenty-three main characters were already created for their first appearance. The first character to be seen was Den Watts, followed by Ali Osman and then Arthur Fowler, all of whom find Reg Cox dying in his flat. Ethel Skinner, Harold Legg and Pauline Fowler appear, after Den alerts them of Reg's death. With Ethel is her pug Willy along with Lou Beale. Saeed and Naima Jeffery are seen working in the local shop whilst Angie Watts is seen in The Queen Victoria, Walford's local pub. Nick Cotton and Sue Osman are next seen, whilst Pete and Kathy Beale work at the fruit and veg stall and Hassan Osman is seen with his parents in the café. Sharon Watts, Ian Beale and Michelle Fowler are next seen and Mark Fowler is seen going into the bookies. Lastly, Roly the dog is seen in the pub when a fight breaks out.

Lofty Holloway is introduced on 26 February along with Terry Rich, and Tony Carpenter is introduced on 28 February. Mary Smith and her daughter Annie are introduced on 5 March. Tony's son Kelvin is introduced on 12 March. Andy O'Brien is introduced on 21 March along with Debbie Wilkins. Chris Smith was introduced on 7 May and Mehmet Osman was introduced on 13 June as a recurring character. Hannah Carpenter arrived on 25 June as Tony's wife and Dot Cotton was introduced on 4 July followed by Ernie Mears on 16 July. Detective Sergeant Roy Quick was introduced on 20 August as Walford's detective. Martin Fowler was born on 30 July and Simon Wicks arrived on 5 October. Lastly, the wife of Mehmet, Guizin Osman arrived on 22 October, and Cassie Carpenter arrived as the daughter of Hannah and Tony.

Den Watts

Den Watts, played by actor Leslie Grantham, is the original landlord of The Queen Victoria. He became well known for his tabloid nickname, "Dirty Den". He is perhaps best remembered for his stormy love-hate relationship with his alcoholic first wife Angie (Anita Dobson), as well as his devoted interaction with their adopted daughter Sharon (Letitia Dean). After nearly 20 years of marriage, he hands divorce papers to Angie in the 1986 Christmas Day episode that was watched by a record-breaking 30.15 million viewers, more than half of the UK population at the time. The character soon departed from the show after getting involved with his local's criminal organization, The Firm – which sparked the events of an attempt on Den's life. For 14 years, it was believed that he had been killed, but he returns to Walford in September 2003. Den was described by EastEnders executive producer Louise Berridge as being arguably one of the most iconic characters ever portrayed in a soap opera.

Ali Osman

Ali Osman, played by Nejdet Salih, is a happy-go-lucky, easy-going chap, in stark contrast to his highly strung wife, Sue (Sandy Ratcliff). He has a compulsive addiction to gambling, which gets him into trouble on more than one occasion and his marriage ends in disaster after he has his wife sectioned. He is a member of the original EastEnders cast, appearing in the first episode on 19 February 1985, and remains with the show for nearly five years afterwards, making his final appearance on 10 October 1989. Ali Osman was one of the original twenty-three characters invented by the creators of EastEnders, Tony Holland and Julia Smith. Ali, a Turkish Cypriot, was originally intended to be named Chris. His name was changed to Ali when it dawned on Holland that he had given a Christian name to a Muslim. Ali was a well-intentioned attempt to represent the proportion of Turkish Cypriots who had immigrated to England and settled in the East End of London. Holland and Smith knew that for the soap to succeed there needed to be a varied group of characters, so that several different sections of the audience had someone to identify with.

Arthur Fowler

Arthur Fowler, played by Bill Treacher, is the father of the Fowler family. Arthur is essentially a good man, but makes some foolish choices and always ends up paying dearly for them. Bossed to the brink of insanity by his wife Pauline (Wendy Richard) and mother-in-law Lou Beale (Anna Wing), Arthur falls into the arms of another woman. During his time in Albert Square he suffers with a mental disorder, is sent to prison twice and eventually dies of a brain haemorrhage in 1996. Arthur Fowler was one of the original twenty-three characters invented by the creators of EastEnders, Tony Holland and Julia Smith. Arthur is a member of the first family of EastEnders, the Beales and Fowlers, and Holland took the inspiration for some of the series' earliest characters from his own London family and background. Arthur's original character outline as written by Smith and Holland appeared in an abridged form in their book, EastEnders: The Inside Story.

Reg Cox

Reg Cox, played by Johnnie Clayton, is a resident of Albert Square. The first episode of EastEnders on 19 February 1985 centres upon pensioner Reg's death.  According to scriptwriter Colin Brake, the creators of EastEnders, Tony Holland and Julia Smith, wanted to start the serial "with a bang, throwing the audience into the middle of life in [the fictional setting of] Walford". The Reg Cox storyline was deemed as a good starting point, allowing various members of the community to be involved with or comment on the circumstances of the old man's murder.

In the first ever scene of the programme, the characters of Den Watts (Leslie Grantham), Arthur Fowler (Bill Treacher), and Ali Osman (Nejdet Salih) are shown breaking down the door of Reg's flat. In Holland and Smith's book, The Inside Story, the authors have outlined their original interpretation of the scene: "[EastEnders] starts with a bang, as a size ten boot kicks down the door that's locked from the inside. The tiny, dirty and foul-smelling council-flat behind the battered door belongs to Reg Cox (known locally as "the-old-boy", and a cantankerous bastard at the best of times) who hasn't been seen around [Albert Square] for days.... Once the door's down, three men rush into the gloomy main-room.... They find the old boy sitting in his favourite armchair beside the gas fire (which isn't on) – and he's very nearly dead.... By the end of the episode the old boy will have been removed from the square and taken to Intensive Care, and the entire community will be rife with gossip, which spreads round the houses like the plague. Via the gossip we're able to piece together the events leading up to the discovery of Reg."

Reg lived alone at 23b Albert Square. On the morning of 19 February 1985, Naima Jeffery (Shreela Ghosh), who runs the shop on Bridge Street, becomes concerned about Reg after he had failed to make his daily milk purchase for the past three days and her husband, Saeed Jeffery (Andrew Johnson), mentions this to Den Watts (Leslie Grantham), publican of the pub next door. Den and Arthur Fowler (Bill Treacher) roused Ali Osman (Nejdet Salih), who lived downstairs from Reg, to let them into the house and the three of them kick in the door to Reg's room when he fails to answer their knocking. Den speaks the opening lines of the first episode, "Stinks in here, dunnit?", followed by the discovery of an unconscious Reg slumped in his armchair in the lounge of his neglected flat. Den runs to get the local doctor, Harold Legg (Leonard Fenton), and calls for an ambulance. On 21 February 1985, they learn that Reg had been severely beaten and died from injuries which had gone unnoticed when he was found. It is eventually revealed that Nick Cotton (John Altman) was behind the beating when he was attempting to steal Reg's war medals.

Reg, who was 59 years old when he died, was not a popular figure in Albert Square. He is referred to as a 'cantankerous old man' by Arthur, called a 'miserable so and so' by Ethel Skinner (Gretchen Franklin) and a 'nasty old man' by his downstairs neighbour, Sue Osman (Sandy Ratcliff). But despite this, Lou Beale (Anna Wing) causes havoc around the Square, accusing Sue of neglect for allowing him to lie dying in his flat for days, without checking up on him. The character also appears in the Christmas special "CivvyStreet", set during the Second World War, shown on 22 December 1988. The teenage Reg is played by Marc Tufano. He has gone AWOL and sells dodgy gear during the Second World War.

In 2014, Reg's murderer, Nick, uses the name 'Reg Cox' as an alias after faking his own death. In 2015, Nick dies in the same place that Reg died exactly 30 years earlier after admitting to his mother, Dot Branning (June Brown), that he killed Reg.

Ethel Skinner

Ethel Skinner played by Gretchen Franklin, is an elderly resident of Walford. An EastEnders original character, Ethel can in the soap's early years often be found wandering the square with her adored pug Willy. She and Dot Cotton (June Brown) are lifelong friends, and although they wind each other up they are dependent on each other. In fact Ethel trusts Dot so much that she even asks her to help her die in 2000, after she is diagnosed with inoperable cancer. Ethel's original character outline states that she was born in 1920. However, during the series this was altered to 1916 and for many years her birthday fell on 19 February. When Ethel comes back to Walford to die in 2000, she reveals to Dot that she had lied about her age for many years.

Ethel, like Reg Cox, also features in the 1988  "CivvyStreet" special, in which the character is played by Alison Bettles.

Pauline Fowler

Pauline Fowler played by Wendy Richard between 1985 and 2006 is the wife of Arthur Fowler (Bill Treacher). Pauline was created by scriptwriter Tony Holland and producer Julia Smith as one of EastEnders original characters. She makes her debut in the soap's first episode on 19 February 1985, and remains for twenty-one years and ten months, making her the second longest-running original character, surpassed only by Ian Beale (Adam Woodyatt). Pauline was a staple in the UK press during her time in EastEnders, representative of the symbiosis between Britain's soaps and tabloid newspapers. Widely read tabloids, such as The Sun and Daily Mirror, would routinely publish articles about forthcoming developments in Pauline's storylines. Critical opinion on the character differs. She has been described as a "legend" and a television icon, but was also voted the 35th-"most annoying person of 2006" (being the only fictional character to appear on the list). The character is well known even outside the show's viewer-base, and away from the on-screen serial, Pauline has been the subject of television documentaries, behind-the-scenes books, tie-in novels and comedy sketch shows.

Harold Legg

Dr. Harold Legg, played by Leonard Fenton, is Walford's original GP. He is widely trusted within the community, and is always on hand to dish out advice. Dr Legg appears as a regular character between 1985 and 1989, but continues to appear in a recurring role until 1997. He was officially retired in 1999 by executive producer Matthew Robinson, though he has made cameos since this time in 2000, 2004 and 2007 and returned one final time in late 2018, before the character was killed off in early 2019. Dr. Harold Legg is one of the original twenty-three characters invented by the creators of EastEnders, Tony Holland and Julia Smith. Dr. Legg is an attempt to represent the successive wave of Jewish immigrants that had settled in the East End of London between 1881 and 1914 in order avoid the persecution that they were being subjected to in Europe. The second generation of East End-born Jews (as Dr. Legg was meant to represent) prospered in the area until the 1930s when Oswald Mosley's British Union of Fascists was formed, and used violence to instil fear in the Jewish population. As the Jewish community grew wealthier, many moved out of the East End to more affluent areas of London, just as the character of Dr. Legg had done on-screen when the show began; living in Islington, but commuting to his practice in Walford.

Saeed Jeffery

Saeed Jeffery, played by Andrew Johnson, is the original owner of the First til Last grocery store. He is never truly accepted in Walford, and his arranged marriage ends in divorce after it is discovered that he had been making obscene phone calls to women. He leaves Walford in disgrace, leaving his business to his wife. Saeed Jeffery is one of the original twenty-three characters invented by the creators of EastEnders, Tony Holland and Julia Smith. Saeed and his wife Naima (Shreela Ghosh) are the first Asian characters to appear in the soap. Black and Asian characters were two ethnic minorities that had previously been under-represented in British soap before EastEnders aired. Holland and Smith knew that for the soap to succeed there needed to be a varied group of characters, so that several different sections of the audience had someone to identify with.

Pete Beale

Pete Beale, played by Peter Dean, makes his first appearance in the programme's first episode, on 19 February 1985. The character was created by Tony Holland, one of the creators of EasEnders; he was based on a member of Holland's family. Pete features in the soap for eight years as the local fruit and veg trader of Albert Square; he is a member of the original focal clan in the serial, the Beales and Fowlers. Pete is portrayed as a macho and somewhat insensitive individual who struggles to cope with emotion. Pete was axed from the soap in 1993 and departed in May that year after over eight years on-screen. The character was killed off-screen later that year following Peter Dean's public criticism of the BBC.

Lou Beale

Lou Beale played by Anna Wing, is the matriarch of the Beale family. Lou Beale was the first EastEnders character to be created by series co-creator Tony Holland, taking the inspiration for some of the series' earliest characters from his own London family and background. Lou is the archetypal East End matriarch throughout EastEnders first three years. An intimidating force within the local community, she is the dowager of Albert Square's central family, the Beales and Fowlers. Never afraid to speak her mind, and woe betide anyone who manages to get on her wrong side, Lou has the respect of her friends and family, even if they do find her a bit of a nuisance at times. Born in the East End, Lou lived in Walford all her life. Albert and Lou came to their house on the corner of Albert Square, number forty-five, on getting married during the 1930s. Lou remained in the house throughout the Second World War and brought up her children there. Her affinity and ties with the area mean that she tends to view Albert Square as her own and that gives her an excuse to intrude into people's business as she sees fit.

The character is played by Karen Meagher in the 1988 EastEnders special, "CivvyStreet", set during the Second World War.

Naima Jeffery

Naima Jeffery, played by Shreela Ghosh, is the wife of Saeed Jeffery (Andrew Johnson). Naima tries to embrace Western culture, but this is not easy since her family constantly try to force her to adhere to their ancient customs. Sick of being forced to live in an arranged marriage with a husband she loathes, Naima makes a stand and shames her family by filing for a divorce. Naima Jeffery is one of the original twenty-three characters invented by the creators of EastEnders, Tony Holland and Julia Smith. Naima and her husband are the first Asian characters to appear in the soap. Black and Asian characters were two ethnic minorities that had previously been under-represented in British soap before EastEnders aired. Holland and Smith knew that for the soap to succeed there needed to be a varied group of characters, so that several different sections of the audience had someone to identify with.

Angie Watts

Angie Watts played by Anita Dobson, appears from the first episode of the show until 1988 when the actress decided to quit and the character was written out. Angie is well known for her cheeky banter, her huge shaggy perm and turning to alcohol during her stormy marriage to cheating Den (Leslie Grantham) which ends when he hands her divorce papers on Christmas Day, in an episode watched by a record-breaking 30.1 million viewers. Despite being the loud and feisty lady of Walford, and having a close relationship with her beloved adopted daughter Sharon (Letitia Dean), she has little real happiness during her time in Albert Square and alcoholism finally claims her life in 2002 when she dies of cirrhosis of the liver. Angie Watts is one of the original twenty-three characters invented by the creators of EastEnders, Tony Holland and Julia Smith. The character of Angie was originally going to be named Pearl and she, her husband and adopted daughter were to be the occupants of the soap's local pub, now famously known as The Queen Vic. Holland, who had worked as a barman in his youth, called upon his own personal experiences to invent the Watts family and the pub they lived in. Holland and Smith had always been critical of the way pubs had been portrayed on television feeling they lacked vitality and life, so they were determined that their pub and occupants were going to be more 'real'. The Watts were seen by Holland as integral to the show's success, partly because he had already guessed that the pub was going to be a monstrous battleground where emotions would run high on a regular basis, and also because the occupants would be providing the majority of the drama.

Willy

Willy is a Pug, who appears in the first episode of the programme and remained in the show until 1992. Willy was cast less than a week before the filming of EastEnders began. From the beginning it was decided that the pensioner Ethel Skinner (Gretchen Franklin) was to have a Yorkshire Terrier named Willy (after her dead husband). The company Janimals, who specialised in providing and training animals for television and films, was contacted by EastEnders co-creator/producer Julia Smith, and informed her that they could provide an experienced pug for the part (he had previously starred in an adaptation of Swallows and Amazons). The dog was brought to the studio to meet Gretchen Franklin, the actress who played Ethel. She took a shine to him straight away and so the pug was cast as Willy. Willy and Roly the poodle shared a dressing room at Elstree Studios.

Roly

Roly is an apricot-coloured Standard Poodle, who appears in the first episode of the programme and remains in the show until 1993. Roly was cast less than a week before the filming of EastEnders began. From the beginning it was decided that the occupants of The Queen Victoria pub, Den, Angie and Sharon Watts, were to have an Alsatian named Prince. However, finding an Alsatian that was light enough in colour not to merge into the background of the set proved to be difficult. Eventually, the co-creator/producer of the show, Julia Smith, was contacted by a company named Janimals, who specialised in providing and training animals for television and films. They had found a seven-month-old Poodle, called Roly, who might still be young enough to be trained. Training was said to take three weeks, and as the Poodle was a similar size to an Alsatian, Roly got the part. Roly was made the property of the BBC, given an ID card, and taken to live with Julia Smith at her home in London. Roly and Willy the pug shared a dressing room at Elstree studios.

Tracey

Tracey (known to fans as Tracey the barmaid) is played by Jane Slaughter. She has appeared as a background character since the first episode on 19 February 1985, when she was seen working on the flower stall in Bridge Street Market. Slaughter was not credited in the role until episode 126 (1 May 1986), which was the first episode in which she spoke. She is the longest-serving character and cast member in the show as Slaughter has been apart of the show from the beginning, she is also the longest-serving female member of the cast in terms of continuous appearances, as other original female cast members who are still in the cast  have taken long-term breaks from the show, and is the only remaining original cast member in the show.

Tracey starts working as a barmaid at The Queen Victoria (The Queen Vic) public house in 1989. Her existence is largely to provide somebody to man the bar while one of the main characters resolves disputes, arguments or disagreements, or tends to the main plot of the episode. Despite featuring on the television programme frequently and occasionally having a line to say, her surname and most of her background is unknown. She has also featured in a few minor storylines. As well as being a barmaid, Tracey owns a flower stall on Bridge Street market. Her stall is regularly robbed by new characters who steal flowers for people they are meeting. She employs workers whilst she does shifts in the pub, including Ina Foot (Ina Clare) and Jean Slater (Gillian Wright). Tracey becomes good friends with Debbie Bates (Nicola Duffett), and is godmother to her daughter Clare Bates (Gemma Bissix). Tracey is often seen to be pleased at the prospect of additional overtime in The Queen Victoria when a Mitchell family wedding or other event is planned, as she can always do with extra money.

On 25 May 1993, Sharon Mitchell (Letitia Dean) told Nigel Bates (Paul Bradley) that she will be late for his birthday party as she would be attending a hen party, which Grant Mitchell (Ross Kemp) confirmed was because Tracey was getting married. After Nigel met and kissed Debbie during his birthday party, he asked Tracey where Debbie was: she replied that she left in a cab, but really liked Nigel and thought he was sweet.

In May 2003, Tracey has a one-night stand with Dennis Rickman (Nigel Harman), the adoptive half-brother of former pub owner Sharon, when he arrives in Albert Square, despite the fact that she is married. The next day, he returns her underwear to her publicly over the bar. In 2005, Sam Mitchell (Kim Medcalf) breaks into the pub with a crowbar, and Tracey discovers her, asking her to leave. Sam knocks Tracey out with the crowbar and drags her, unconscious, into the bathroom, locking her in. Sam goes downstairs to unearth the body of Den Watts (Leslie Grantham), who is buried in the basement, and when the police arrive, Tracey is comforted by Little Mo Mitchell (Kacey Ainsworth). After Sam is released from prison on bail, she apologises to Tracey, but Tracey appears shaken by the ordeal and scared of Sam.

On 7 August 2008, Tracey opens up when Sean Slater (Robert Kazinsky) questions why she is so quiet. She says she wants to keep herself to herself because she thinks that the Mitchells are all "stark raving mad" and that she does not fear any new barmaids, as she has seen them come and go, but knows that she will always be behind the bar. She goes on to say that whoever lives in the pub is "cursed" in her opinion, and that they will never be able to live happily together.

In March 2009, Archie Mitchell (Larry Lamb) makes Tracey a cleaner at The Queen Vic, and she is pleased with the extra money. She attends Peggy Mitchell's (Barbara Windsor) hen party, and Peggy and Archie's wedding on 2 April. On 16 April 2009, Shirley Carter (Linda Henry) accuses Phil Mitchell (Steve McFadden) of drinking again. However, Phil denies this, saying that he had broken a bottle of alcohol earlier, and Tracey backs him up. On 28 April 2009, Tracey answers the phone to Minty Peterson (Cliff Parisi) questioning Phil's whereabouts from the night before. Tracey tells Phil about having to talk to the bank regarding some money issues. Following that, Phil pressures Tracey into talking about her feelings, supposedly for him, and mentioning her husband in the process. Finally, she appears again towards the end of the episode, wanting to help Ben Mitchell (Charlie Jones) get to school as Phil is too drunk to assist him. Phil, flirting with Tracey, tells her that her husband will not mind.

On 30 April 2009, she finds Heather Trott's (Cheryl Fergison) lost inhaler. On 30 July, she phones in sick with a back injury, and Peggy says it was unlike her to miss a shift, so it must be serious. Dot Branning (June Brown) describes Tracey as the person who "sees everything but says very little". On 8 September, Peggy tells Sam (now played by Danniella Westbrook) that Tracey still holds a grudge against her. On 26 November, Tracey covers for both Peggy and Phil when bailiffs ask for them, by pretending she is just a barmaid from an agency and does not know them. She then informs Ben he needs to tell Phil that the bailiffs are looking for him and want to repossess his car.

On 24 December, Archie and his fiancée Janine Butcher (Charlie Brooks) take over the pub, ousting Peggy and her family. Tracey is unhappy with the way Archie and Janine treated Peggy and the rest of the Mitchell family, and when Janine tells Tracey to put some tinsel in her hair and to keep an eye on the Christmas dinner, Tracey leaves a note saying "Gone fishing", implying that she has resigned. The next day, Tracey is present when Ronnie Mitchell (Samantha Womack) is arrested on suspicion of Archie's murder (see "Who Killed Archie?"), and looks shocked. She also attends Jean Slater's (Gillian Wright) birthday party on 11 January 2010. When Mo Harris (Laila Morse) opens a betting circle on the identity of Archie's killer, she lists Tracey as the rank outsider, giving her the nickname "Silent Assassin".

On 18 January 2010, Tracey appears behind the bar in a non-speaking capacity for The Queen Vic's reopening. On 22 January, the pub's new owner, Roxy Mitchell (Rita Simons), gives Tracey a warning for arriving two hours late, but Peggy explains that she asked her to come in late as she has done a lot of unpaid overtime recently. Later, Roxy sacks Tracey because she wants the pub to have younger bar staff. Peggy demands that Roxy beg Tracey to come back for the evening shift as workers like Tracey are "gold dust". Peggy tells Tracey on the phone that she is not sacked but Tracey hangs up. Tracey decides to take Roxy to an unfair dismissal tribunal, so Roxy says she will audition a new barmaid, giving Tracey a chance but making sure she loses.

However, when Roxy realises she does not know how to run a pub, she gives Tracey her job back. Tracey suggests a curry night, and Roxy is happy to leave Tracey in charge of it, saying it is the most she has ever heard her speak. On that same day, viewers find out that Tracey and Shirley are good friends. In March 2010, Billie Jackson (Devon Anderson) holds up The Queen Vic, asking Tracey for cash and saying he has a gun. She fills his bag with cash but Phil takes it off her. In September 2010, following a fire at The Queen Vic, Tracey starts working at Ian Beale's (Adam Woodyatt) fish and chip shop. The next month, Alfie Moon (Shane Richie) offers Tracey her old job back at The Queen Vic, along with Stacey Branning (Lacey Turner), after he reopens the pub.

In January 2011, during a conversation with Kat Moon (Jessie Wallace), it is revealed that Tracey has a son who lives with his father. When Kat asks for her opinion on herself on a down day, Tracey replies that she thinks Kat is scary. When David Wicks (Michael French) returns for his mother Pat Evans' (Pam St Clement) funeral, he comments to his daughter Bianca Butcher (Patsy Palmer) that he was amazed Tracey was still working in The Queen Vic, which prompted Bianca to say that Tracey was one of the few things in the world that was reliable.

On 14 June 2012, Tracey gives Jean her job back on the flower stall. However, Tracey later sacks Jean after she rows with customers Michael Moon (Steve John Shepherd) and Janine Butcher. In August 2012, after Billy Mitchell (Perry Fenwick) announces to the customers in The Queen Vic that Sharon has returned, only Tracey greets her and meets her son Dennis Rickman Jnr (Harry Hickles).

In December 2013, Phil sells the pub to Mick Carter (Danny Dyer) and when Tracey arrives to work her shift, Mick's wife, Linda Carter (Kellie Bright) tells her that she is not wanted any more. Shirley witnesses this and tells Linda that Tracey is "part of the furniture" at The Queen Vic. Tracey is then later seen when she and Linda become friends, and she resumes her job at The Queen Vic. In April 2014, the market merges with Spring Lane Market, and this brings in a new florist, Pam Coker (Lin Blakley); however, when discussing the competition with Alfie, Pam states she has no competition, implying that Tracey no longer runs a flower stall.

In September 2015, Tracey is shocked when she answers The Queen Vic telephone to Kathy Sullivan (Gillian Taylforth), who is believed to be dead. Kathy asks Tracey to pass on an address to Phil. After being confronted by Mick, she finds Phil. Phil tries to persuade her it was a joke, but Tracey is not convinced, and knows it was Kathy; she gives him Kathy's whereabouts. The following month, Tracey finally meets Kathy again and welcomes her home.

Eight months later, Tracey welcomes another old friend back to Walford, as she greets Peggy when she rides around the square in a milk float. In April 2017, the freehold of The Queen Vic is sold when the Carters get into debt. Business consultant Fi Browning (Lisa Faulkner) advises that the pub is overstaffed, and suggests two members of staff need to go. The Carter family refuse to sack Tracey, who they describe as "an institution", but new bar manager Woody Woodward (Lee Ryan) insists Tracey has to go. An upset Tracey runs from the room after Woody sacks her. A farewell party for Tracey is thrown, but she decides not to show up for it and everyone decides to boycott The Queen Vic. Vincent Hubbard (Richard Blackwood) then offers Tracey a job at his bar, The Albert. When Linda returns from Watford, Fi is annoyed when Linda gives Tracey her job back without consulting her.

In February 2020, Tracey attends the Queen Vic boat party and tells Mo about the time she and Phil had sex.

Development
Being one of the only remaining original cast members in the show, Slaughter said that when she joined the show "she recognised that EastEnders could run and be something very exciting" and that she "never dreamed [that it would last] 25 years" but she "certainly knew it was special." When asked to pick her favourite storyline she said, "In terms of actually watching and seeing scenes, I've been lucky being in The Vic. I've seen so many good ones – with the Mitchells, with Phil, with Peggy – I've been very, very lucky to see so many, that it's nigh on impossible to single any out. They've all involved different people – I could go on and on and on!" Slaughter noted that "She's always there whereas other cast members such as Adam [Woodyatt] – who's been there as long as I have – wouldn't necessarily have a storyline that puts him in The Vic at all." She also added, "For me as a character, it has to be Tracey speaking to Sean Slater. It was hysterical. For someone who never says anything, she suddenly had an opinion about everything, which I just loved. It was written by Christopher Reason and done so well. To get someone who only occasionally says things like 'out the back' and make what she says make sense – he did a fantastic job. That was very memorable because everyone was so supportive."

In 2010, Slaughter said that it would not make sense to make Tracey into "this talkative, all-singing, all-dancing person with a fully-fledged family and surname." Slaughter described her character as "lovely", "clever", "loyal but strong" and "opinionated". Jane Simon from the Daily Mirror described her as "silent".

In May 2009, Digital Spy asked EastEnders producer Diederick Santer what was in store for Tracey. He said, "You just have to watch out for any script that Christopher Reason writes. Chris is obsessed with Tracey and with Jane Slaughter, who plays her. He gives her loads to do, which is fantastic. When we give her more to do, she absolutely delivers. We think she's fab."

Tracey was one of the 'outsiders' in the "Who Killed Archie?" storyline, with many viewers thinking the culprit could be her. In a poll run by Digital Spy, 7.9% of voters thought that Tracey had killed Archie Mitchell, and in a second poll, 7.1% thought that it was her. When asked if she thought Tracey could kill, she said, "I wouldn't think she's that dark but who knows – she could be. I've heard there are odds at the bookies to be had for her but why? Why would she have killed him? Because he's threatening The Vic? Is it The Vic she protects or the family?" It was later revealed that bookmakers William Hill had slashed the odds on Tracey being the killer, with 7/1 thinking she killed Archie. The killer was later revealed to be Stacey Slater.

Reception
Dek Hogan from Digital Spy hailed Tracey when she had a line of dialogue, and said it was "such a rare event that it's always worthy of a celebration. Fair play, she did mumble it a bit and it was so unmemorable that I've forgotten what it was she actually said but it was a line nonetheless." He also said that she, Winston (Ulric Browne) and other background characters should have a daytime soap, saying it would be a ratings winner. Kris Green, also from Digital Spy, said that he wanted to ask scriptwriters to give more lines to Tracey, in addition to calling Tracey's scenes with Sean Slater "iconic". Jane Simon from the Daily Mirror said that whenever Tracey speaks, "it's worth listening to".

Nick Cotton

Nick Cotton, played by John Altman, is a recurring character who appears in the soap's debut episode in February 1985, through to his last appearance, in which he dies, in 2015. Nick is the son of characters Charlie (Christopher Hancock) and Dot Cotton (June Brown), and the father of Charlie Cotton Ashley, and Dotty Cotton (Molly Conlin). His storylines saw him twice committed murder of Reg Cox and Eddie Royle respectively, succumb to a heroin addiction, and attempt to poison his own mother, causing the death of his son Ashley amongst numerous other misdemeanors. Nick is also the subject of a special spin-off episode, The Return of Nick Cotton, which aired in October 2000. He has been voted one of television's all-time most villainous characters in a Channel 4 poll. He is seen as the show's original villain. Nick dies of a heroin overdose on 13 February 2015 in the house in which he killed Reg Cox 30 years earlier.

Sue Osman

Sue Osman, played by Sandy Ratcliff, is the wife of Ali Osman (Nejdet Salih). Sue is one of the serial's original characters, appearing in its first episode on 19 February 1985 and departing on-screen in May 1989. Created by Tony Holland and Julia Smith, Sue is portrayed as argumentative, insecure and tragic. A pivotal storyline in the character's narrative is the cot-death of her son, which is one of the show's first controversial plots. During her four years on-screen, the character contends with a phantom pregnancy, marital breakdown and finally insanity.

Kathy Beale

Kathy Beale (also Mitchell and Sullivan), played by Gillian Taylforth between 1985 and 2000, and then from 2015 onwards, is the mother of Ian Beale (Adam Woodyatt). Though it was never used on screen, in 2010 the BBC website named the character as Kathy Sullivan due to a marriage after she left the show in 2000. Kathy Beale is one of the serial's original characters, appearing in the first episode of EastEnders on 19 February 1985. One of the longest-running original characters, Kathy remains in a prominent role, covering issues such as rape and domestic violence until April 1998, when Taylforth quit. A year later, in 1999, Taylforth returned for a temporary stint to aid the departure of actor Ross Kemp who played her brother-in-law Grant Mitchell, and later in December 1999 for the wedding of her screen son Ian. She made her final appearance in January 2000. Despite various rumours of a possible return for Kathy in the press, this did not occur and the character was supposedly killed off-screen in a road accident in late February 2006 in a storyline to facilitate the return of her son Ben to his father Phil (Steve McFadden). In tribute to the character, the soap's café is named "Kathy's". Kathy returned for the 30th anniversary episode in February 2015, when it was revealed that Kathy never died in a surprise showdown with her ex-husband, Phil.

Hassan Osman

Hassan Osman, played by Michael Evangelou, is the first son of Ali Osman (Nejdet Salih) and Sue Osman (Sandy Ratcliff), who is only a baby during his short time in EastEnders. Hassan dies in his sleep on 20 June 1985; no official causes of death are given. Sue is left in a state of shock after her son's death. She remains in a trance-like state for weeks and refuses to eat, sleep, cry or acknowledge her grief. She later begins blaming herself unfairly for her son's sudden death. Her mental health continues to deteriorate and she becomes despondent towards Ali and their marriage disintegrates in a welter of depression. Sue eventually manages to come to terms with Hassan's death with the help of Harold Legg (Leonard Fenton), who takes the drastic measure of placing Mary Smith's (Linda Davidson) baby, Annie Smith (Zara Posener), in her lap, finally allowing her to acknowledge her pent-up sadness.

Development
Before EastEnders initially aired, creators Tony Holland and Julia Smith had already decided that Sue and Ali Osman would be parents to a young baby named Hassan. However, as further characters were invented they realised that there would be a total of four babies in the show: Annie Smith (Zara Posener), Martin Fowler (Jon Peyton Price), Vicki Fowler (Emma Herry) and Hassan. It was decided that it would be impossible for the studios to cope with four babies and so they invented a storyline to eliminate one from the cast. During this time, the topic of sudden infant death syndrome was prominent in the British press, partly due to an increase in casualties, but also because a doctor had gone public with the accusation that parents were to blame for the tragic occurrence. Holland and Smith decided that covering this issue in the soap would be a good way of 'setting the record straight', and so it was decided that Sue and Ali's baby would die from cot death in the early months of the show. This was the first of many controversial storylines in EastEnders history. After the storyline aired in June 1985, the show was praised by audience and press alike for the sensitive and unsensational way this harrowing subject was treated. The sudden tragedy came as a surprise to the audience, especially since the bereaved parents were a couple whose feuding, fighting ways had made them appear rather comic in the early episodes of the show. The British Cot Death Foundation initially feared that a soap opera would trivialise the subject and frighten new parents. They tried to stop the episodes from airing, but in the end they were pleased with the way the subject was handled, and provided back-up support after transmission to many viewers who wanted more information on the subject.

Sharon WattsSharon Watts (also Rickman and Mitchell), played by Letitia Dean, is the daughter of Den (Leslie Grantham) and Angie Watts (Anita Dobson). Sharon is a regular character in the first 10 years of the programme, after which she leaves and returns several times. Sharon is the adoptive daughter of the popular 'supercouple'; Den and Angie. She was known to Den as his "princess" and he made sure suitors watched their step around the teenage Sharon. Even though she disapproved of her father's dodgy deals and his constant fighting with binge-drinker Angie, she loved them both nonetheless. She made a permanent return to the show in 2012.

Ian BealeIan Beale, played by Adam Woodyatt between 1985 and 2021, is the longest-serving character and the only remaining original character to have appeared continuously since the first episode on 19 February 1985. The character appeared in his 2,000th episode in the show on 26 March 2007. Ian Beale is one of the original twenty-three characters invented by the creators of EastEnders, Tony Holland and Julia Smith. Ian is a member of the first family of EastEnders, the Beales and Fowlers, and Holland took the inspiration for some of the series' earliest characters from his own London family and background. Ian's original character outline as written by Smith and Holland appeared in an abridged form in their book, EastEnders: The Inside Story.

Michelle FowlerMichelle Fowler (also Holloway), played by Susan Tully from 1985 to 1995 and Jenna Russell from 2016 to 2018, is the daughter of Arthur Fowler (Bill Treacher) and Pauline Fowler (Wendy Richard). Although she is one of the brighter people in Walford, that does not stop Michelle making some huge mistakes during her time in Albert Square. Michelle has a habit of choosing the wrong men and her stubborn nature means that she rarely accepts anyone's help or listens to good advice. She is tough, feisty, determined, outspoken and never afraid to defend herself or her beliefs. Early on in the series, the character of Michelle becomes central to the programme and is the focus of a controversial storyline involving her teenage pregnancy. Press interest in the show escalated to "record levels" as journalists continuously tried to predict who had fathered Michelle's baby. In whodunnit fashion, the audience had been kept in the dark as to the real identity of the father and were given teasers implicating several residents on The Square. The audience finally discovered the culprit in episode 66 of the programme, October 1985. The episode was written by series co-creator/script editor Tony Holland and directed by co-creator/producer Julia Smith, and was considered to be a landmark episode in the show's history. Four possible suspects are seen leaving the Square in the early half of the episode: Tony Carpenter (Oscar James), Ali Osman (Nejdet Salih), Andy O'Brien (Ross Davidson) and Den Watts (Leslie Grantham). As Michelle waits by their rendezvous point a car pulls up and finally the fluffy white legs of Roly the poodle bound out of the car, and give it all away: Den Watts is the man meeting Michelle and it was he who had fathered her baby. The rest of the episode consists of just one long scene, where Den and Michelle discuss whether or not to keep the baby. Up to that time it was the longest scene ever done in a soap-opera, lasting fifteen minutes.

Mark FowlerMark Fowler is an original regular character in the series starting February 1985 but becomes a semi-regular after his original portrayer David Scarboro was written out of the role in April 1985. Scarboro made brief returns to the role in 1986 and 1987; he committed suicide in April 1988. The role was recast with Todd Carty in 1990. From this point the character, played by Carty, became a permanent fixture in the series until being written out of the series in early 2003. Mark starts out as a delinquent teenager, but returns to Walford a changed man when he was 22. Contracting HIV forces him to grow up fast and accept his responsibilities. He frequently finds it difficult to accept the restrictions of the illness, which finally claims his life in April 2004.

Lofty HollowayLofty Holloway, played by Tom Watt, is one of the serial's original characters, making his first appearance in the third episode, 26 February 1985. Lofty is generally depicted as a meek, luckless and hapless victim. A long-running storyline concerns his relationship with the character Michelle Fowler (Susan Tully). Their unhappy marriage finally disintegrates after Michelle has an abortion, and Lofty leaves Walford for a new start. The character's final appearance is in the episode first aired on 19 April 1988. Lofty was one of the original twenty-three characters invented by the creators of EastEnders, Tony Holland and Julia Smith. Both felt that to help complete the community there was a need for a character in his early twenties. He had to be someone a bit different – not brash and confident like a lot of the older men, and not boisterous like the younger ones; a loner, maybe someone forced to be a loner, a person who "stuck out like a sore thumb" – someone that was happiest in a group but still could not find one in which he fitted. Tony Holland had previously been in the army and found that ex-soldiers had these problems when they tried to reintegrate as civilians. So they decided that Lofty would be an ex-soldier, forced to quit because of his asthma. He was happiest in the army and felt incomplete without the group setting, the all-male camaraderie and even the security of the uniformity that the army provides.

Terry RichDS Terry Rich, played by Gary Whelan, first appears in the series on 26 February 1985 and makes his last appearance on 14 May 1987. He investigates the death of Reg Cox (Johnnie Clayton), who died the previous week, and his death is believed to be a murder. Rich, of the Walford CID, arrives in Albert Square to conduct an inquiry.

The following week, a badge that Lofty Holloway (Tom Watt) is wearing on his jumper catches the eye of Dr Legg (Leonard Fenton), who recognises it as one that he saw in Reg's collection of Nazi badges from the war. A few hours later, Rich arrives at The Queen Victoria where Lofty is tending bar and questions him about how he got the badge. Lofty reluctantly admits that he bought it from Mark Fowler (David Scarboro) for five pounds. When questioned by Rich, Mark insists that he found the badge on the street. However, a month into the investigation, Rich learns that Mark had obtained the badge from Nick Cotton (John Altman) and ransacked Nick's home to find the remains of Reg's collection along with other incriminating evidence. Nick then flees Walford, but is arrested the following month for Reg's murder, although he is never charged.

Rich returns in 1987 to investigate the case of the 'Walford attacker', who has assaulted several female inhabitants of Albert Square. In April of that year, Debbie Wilkins (Shirley Cheriton), averts an attack using self-defence, which leads to the attacker's arrest. Rich is impressed with the way Debbie conducted herself so he asks her if she would help him out on some police business. Rich asks Debbie to go to a French restaurant with him on an undercover operation to expose French restaurants using English waiters. Debbie agrees, but whilst on their mock date they bond and when they return to The Queen Victoria they make a dinner date for the next night to a Chinese restaurant and they are soon inseparable. Debbie's flatmate, Naima Jeffery (Shreela Ghosh), seems to dislike Rich immensely, but this does not perturb Debbie, and when Rich asks her to marry him, she gleefully accepts. The following month Rich is transferred to another division in Crawley, so Debbie decides to leave Walford with him.

Tony CarpenterTony Carpenter, played by Oscar James, is a jovial character, who tries to establish a successful business and steady home for his family, but nothing he does is ever good enough for his nagging wife. Tony is one of the original twenty-three characters invented by the creators of EastEnders, Tony Holland and Julia Smith. Tony was originally intended to be named Alan, and his son Kelvin Carpenter was originally named Kevin. They are the first black characters to appear in the soap. Black and Asian characters were two ethnic minorities that had previously been under-represented in British soap before EastEnders aired. Holland and Smith knew that for the soap to succeed there needed to be a varied group of characters, so that several different sections of the audience had someone to identify with. Additionally, if the programme was to be realistic, it had to reflect the cross-section of society that actually existed in the real location.  For these reasons, different sexes, ages, classes, religions and races were all included in the original character line-up. Both Holland and Smith had been at the forefront of the move towards 'integrated casting' in television and had encountered an array of ethnic diversities in the process. Even though the ethnic minority groups were deemed the hardest to research, Holland and Smith called upon their contacts to relay information about their origins and lifestyles and were then able to portray Walford's most recent immigrants more realistically.

Mary SmithMary Smith, played by Linda Davidson, is a punk, and Walford's original wild child. She often makes life difficult for herself due to her stubborn, defensive nature and she tends to feel that everyone around her is out to get her. In fact, Mary is her own worst enemy and most of her misfortune is down to her irresponsible behaviour and her inability to heed good advice. Mary Smith is one of the original twenty-three characters invented by the creators of EastEnders, Tony Holland and Julia Smith. Mary's original character outline as written by Smith and Holland appeared in an abridged form in their book, EastEnders: The Inside Story. As Holland and Smith wanted a diverse cross-section from the East End community, it was decided that one of the main cast had to be a young, single mother, and as punk music was prominent in British culture at the time, they decided to use a punk image for the character. Holland and Smith decided to cast an unknown actress in the role. They chose Linda Davidson, who was the right age and had been brought up in northern England and therefore had an accent that would befit the character's background.

Annie SmithAnnie Smith, played by Zara Posener and Jenna Alembick from 1985 to 1986 and by Samantha Crown from 1986 to 1988, is the young daughter of punk Mary Smith (Linda Davidson). Her father was a member of a punk group of which Mary was a groupie, and had no contact with her. Annie returned in 2019, played by Marilyn O'Brien.

Annie, who was born prematurely, is three months old when she arrives, along with Mary, on 5 March 1985 and initially resides with her mother at 23b Albert Square. Mary is an incredibly irresponsible mother and Annie is always getting lumbered on neighbours when Mary gets tired of looking after her. Dot Cotton (June Brown) and Sue Osman (Sandy Ratcliff) are the usual victims, but almost everyone on Albert Square has a turn of looking after Annie. Sue, in particular, grows extremely fond of Annie following the death of her son, Hassan Osman. After bottling up her grief for months, she is forced to hold little Annie, which finally allows her to acknowledge her pent-up sadness.

Annie is once left alone in the launderette by accident while Mary goes drinking in The Queen Victoria pub. Debbie Wilkins (Shirley Cheriton) finds her and returns her to her mother, along with a few choice words for Mary. Mary also has a tendency to leave Annie home alone whilst she goes out to prostitute herself at night. On one such occasion, Annie throws her blanket at the electric fan heater, causing a fire. Arthur Fowler (Bill Treacher) rescues her but as a result, Annie is removed from Mary's care and given to her grandparents, Chris Smith (Allan O'Keefe) and Edie Smith (Eileen O'Brien), who live in Stockport. With the help of Mary's boyfriend, Rod Norman (Christopher McHallem), and Carmel Jackson (Judith Jacob), Annie is eventually reunited with her mother, although it takes a lot of persuading to make Edie return her, as she feels that Mary is not capable of caring for a young child. Annie spends Christmas Day 1987 in hospital after Chris, who is drunk, abducts her in an attempt to take her back to Stockport and crashes his car into a wall, though Annie is unharmed. Eventually, Mary decides to leave Albert Square for good with Annie in May 1988.

Nearly 31 years later, Mary returns to Walford with Annie who is now 34 years old to attend the funeral of Dr Legg (Leonard Fenton). Whilst reminiscing with Dot, Lofty Holloway (Tom Watt) and Sharon Mitchell (Letitia Dean), Mary states that Annie works for the police force. They later light a candle in Dr Legg's memory before leaving Walford again.

Kelvin CarpenterKelvin Carpenter, played by Paul J. Medford, is an original EastEnders character. A bright spark and full of initiative, he opens several businesses in Albert Square and even forms a band. He is a bit of a heartbreaker in the early years of EastEnders, but he eventually has his heart broken in return, when his middle-aged girlfriend jilts him. Always a bit too intelligent for Walford, Kelvin eventually leaves for university and has since married a model wife and has become a songwriter. Kelvin Carpenter was one of the original twenty-three characters invented by the creators of EastEnders, Tony Holland and Julia Smith. Kelvin was originally intended to be named Kevin, and his father Tony Carpenter was originally named Alan. They are the first black characters to appear in the soap.

Andy O'BrienAndy O'Brien, played by Ross Davidson, is one of the original characters created for the series. Andy makes his appearance one month after the show first broadcast in March 1985. Portrayed as altruistic and middle-class, Andy and his partner Debbie (Shirley Cheriton) are an attempt to represent gentrification of the East End. Despite Davidson claiming that there had been plans for his character, Andy became the first regular character in EastEnders to be killed off. Davidson claims this was due to an altercation between himself and Executive Producer and show creator Julia Smith. His death scene aired in August 1986.

Debbie WilkinsDebbie Wilkins, played by Shirley Cheriton, is Walford's first upwardly mobile character. She has an on/off relationship with her ill-fated boyfriend Andy O'Brien (Ross Davidson). Andy and she tend to be a bit too pretentious for the working class locals of Albert Square. Debbie Wilkins is one of the original twenty-three characters invented by the creators of EastEnders, Tony Holland and Julia Smith. The character of Debbie along with her boyfriend Andy are an attempt by Holland and Smith to represent the influx of upwardly mobile people that were opting to move to the usually working-class areas of the East End of London. Gentrification of the East End was on the increase in the 1980s, and in Holland's experience, the new, wealthier residents were never welcomed or truly accepted within the community, and this was what he hoped to convey on-screen with these two characters.

Big RonBig Ron, played by Ron Tarr, works in Walford market and appears as a background character from 1985 to 1997. Ron's first line in the series is, "All right, Den?", said to Den Watts (Leslie Grantham), five months after Ron first appears. His first credited appearance is episode 177, dated 28 October 1986, when he witnesses Ali Osman (Nejdet Salih) and his brother, Mehmet Osman (Haluk Bilginer), arguing and asks Ali's wife, Sue Osman (Sandy Ratcliff), if she needs any help. He is credited in the episode as "stall holder" and this is also the first time he is named as Ron in dialogue. Ron is involved in a few storylines, including helping his friend Pete Beale (Peter Dean) to intimidate rapist James Willmott-Brown (William Boyde) into leaving the area, and having a heart attack after he is pushed by a mugger in the market. Richard Cole (Ian Reddington) gives Ron's pitch away, leading the other stall holders to rebel against him, until his boss orders him to give it back to Ron. In August 1994, Ron sells cheap wallpaper to Arthur Fowler (Bill Treacher), which falls off the walls overnight, so Arthur makes Ron help him put up new wallpaper. Ron joins The Queen Victoria football team as goalkeeper. He makes three saves during their first match, which they go on to win 2–0.

The actor Ron Tarr died of cancer in October 1997 and was appearing in pre-recorded episodes several weeks after his death. To explain the character's absence, he was given an off-screen storyline in early 1998 where he wins £500,000 on the National Lottery and emigrates to Spain. In a report about Tarr's death in the Daily Mirror, journalist Chris Hughes stated the character had "a cult following". Ron could have appeared in a special episode of the popular science fiction series Doctor Who, entitled Dimensions in Time (1993). The episode was specially created as part of BBC's annual fund-raising event, Children in Need. Viewers were asked to phone in and vote which EastEnders character, Mandy Salter (Nicola Stapleton) or Ron, would appear in the show and save The Doctor from certain death. Two versions were filmed for each voting outcome, but the Mandy version won with 56% of the vote.

Chris SmithChris Smith (initially credited as 'Man', then as Mary's father), played by Allan O'Keefe, is the father of Mary Smith (Linda Davidson). A haulage driver from Stockport, he is first seen in Walford in May 1985 when he comes to visit his wayward daughter. Mary (or Theresa as she was known to Chris) had left Stockport to escape her family, so she is not pleased when Chris arrives and tries to persuade her to return with him so he can help bring up her young daughter. After several ill-fated attempts, Mary sends him away.

In 1987, Mary begins prostituting herself. She leaves her young baby, Annie Smith, at home alone while she works. On one occasion, Annie throws a blanket out of her cot straight on to an electric fan heater, causing a fire. Annie is rescued but Mary's neighbour, Dot Cotton (June Brown), phones Chris, who returns to Walford and takes Annie to live with him and his wife, Edie Smith (Eileen O'Brien), in Stockport.

Mary's boyfriend, Rod Norman (Christopher McHallem), tries to help Mary sort her life out so she can get her daughter back. Even though Mary seems to be better, Edie has grown so attached to Annie that she is unwilling to relinquish care. By December, Chris finally decides that Annie should be reunited with Mary. Edie is unhappy about this and tells Chris that he can only come home when he brings Annie back. On Christmas Eve 1987, after desperately trying to convince Mary to return to Stockport, a very drunk Chris abducts Annie and tries to drive her home, only to crash into a wall at the local bed and breakfast on Bridge Street. Mary is forced to spend Christmas Day in hospital so Annie can be monitored. Chris desperately tries to make amends for his mistake, but she cannot forgive him until Annie is given the all clear later that day, so a jubilant Mary accepts her father's apology.

In early 1988, Chris makes plans to open up a haulage company at a disused tyre shop in Albert Square, but finds out that his driving licence is to be suspended for 18 months following his drink driving accident. Nevertheless, he contacts his friend, Harry Jameson (Anthony Dutton) to go into partnership and even manages to persuade Ali Osman (Nejdet Salih) to provide some capital. However, Ali pulls out of the deal and Chris turns to alcohol, regularly drinking himself into a stupor to drown his sorrows. A concerned Mary then decides to contact her mother, who returns to Walford to help her husband. By May, Chris succeeds in opening the haulage company open by borrowing money from Walford Investments – the money lending organisation of The Firm – but the antics of his daughter, who starts to use drugs again and neglect Annie, cause further family strife. In a bid to help Mary out, Chris offers her a job at the haulage company but Mary gets annoyed by her parents' interference, and after sabotaging her father's office with paint, she and Annie leave Walford.

Chris stays in Walford to run his business, employing Rod as a bookkeeper and Charlie Cotton (Christopher Hancock) as lorry driver, although he is extremely unreliable. However, Chris is still short of drivers, so he starts doing deliveries himself, despite having a suspended licence. Darren Roberts (Gary McDonald), who had had several run-ins with Chris regarding the theft of his JCB earlier that year, informs the police that he is driving illegally and Chris is fined £1000. This severely cripples his business and he is unable to repay his loan. Gregory Mantel (Pavel Douglas), a member of The Firm, then arrives on the Square, looking for Chris and forces him to sign the business over to The Firm, leaving Chris no choice but to return to Stockport. His last appearance is in August 1988. The premises of the haulage company are eventually bought by Frank Butcher (Mike Reid), who converts it into the car lot.

Mehmet OsmanMehmet Osman, played by Haluk Bilginer, is a recurring character appearing from 1985 to 1989. Mehmet is portrayed as a charmer, rogue and a serial womaniser. He was conceptualised by the creators of EastEnders, Tony Holland and Julia Smith. Mehmet, the brother of original character Ali Osman (Nejdet Salih), is part of a well-intentioned attempt to represent the proportion of Turkish Cypriots who had immigrated to England and settled in the East End of London. Holland and Smith knew that for the soap to succeed there needed to be a varied group of characters, so that several different sections of the audience had someone to identify with. Additionally, if the programme was to be realistic, it had to reflect the cross-section of society that actually existed in the real location. For these reasons, different sexes, ages, classes, religions and races were all included in the original character line-up. Both Holland and Smith had been at the forefront of the move towards 'integrated casting' in television and had encountered an array of ethnic diversities in the process. Even though the ethnic minority groups were deemed the hardest to research, Holland and Smith called upon their social contacts to relay information about their own origins and lifestyles, which they say allowed them to portray Walford's most recent immigrants more realistically.

Hannah CarpenterHannah Carpenter, played by Sally Sagoe, is the former wife of Tony Carpenter (Oscar James). She is a religious woman who is active in the Pentecostal Church but lost all tolerance for her fun-loving husband. After they agreed to divorce, their son, Kelvin Carpenter (Paul J. Medford), moves to the Square to live with his father in February 1985, while their daughter, Cassie Carpenter (Delanie Forbes), stays with her mother. Hannah's first appearance in Walford is in June 1985 and throughout the year she shows up occasionally to converse with Tony about issues concerning their children. Hannah constantly looks down on Tony's lifestyle and career, so their meetings are never pleasant.

When Hannah meets the smooth talking corporate lawyer, Neville Agard (Gordon Case), she invites him to move into her house. Eventually, Neville buys the house and they announce their intention to wed. However, when she discovers that Neville has a violent temper and has beaten her daughter with a riding whip, she confronts him and after a row results in violence she leaves him and turns up on Tony's doorstep at number 3 Albert Square in April 1986. Tony is furious and goes to confront Neville, returning later covered in blood. Hannah is adamant that she will not return to Neville, so she and Cassie come to live with Tony and they decide to try to give their marriage another chance.

Their reconciliation is not a happy one and it is not long before Hannah had returns to her nagging ways. She is unhappy to be living in a house that is in the throes of renovation and she constantly harangues Tony to do better and try harder. She also manages to upset her children by trying to put a stop to her son's relationship with Carmel Roberts (Judith Jacob) and forcing Cassie to go to boarding school.

In 1987 Hannah begins to become disillusioned with Walford after getting accosted by both Rezaul Kabir (Tanveer Ghani) and Mehmet Osman (Haluk Bilginer). She is also stalked one night by a man known as the Walford attacker, who is guilty of assaulting several female inhabitants of the Square. Hannah is shaken but unharmed. She later relays to Tony that she fears that Mehmet is the culprit, because he had made a pass at her previously. Tony is furious, and he along with Den Watts (Leslie Grantham) and Pete Beale (Peter Dean) go to track Mehmet down and teach him a lesson. After Hannah witnesses her husband attacking Mehmet, she takes the moral high-ground and denounces his barbaric actions, despite previously being happy for Tony to resort to violence against Neville. Hannah then decides that their marriage is over and so she leaves Walford in February that year to go and live with her sister in another part of London. She is not seen again.

Dot CottonDorothy "Dot" Branning (also Cotton), played by June Brown, is the mother of original character Nick Cotton (John Altman). In a special episode entitled "Dot's Story" (2003), a young Dot is played by Tallulah Pitt-Brown in flashbacks. Dot first appears in EastEnders in July 1985, and worked as a launderette assistant for most of that time along with original character Pauline Fowler (Wendy Richard). Dot moved away with her son and his family in 1993. In reality, Brown left the show in 1993, unhappy with the development of her character. Brown returned to the role in April 1997, and on 28 April 2017, Dot overtook Pat Butcher (Pam St Clement) as the second-longest-serving character in EastEnders, surpassed only by original character Ian Beale. 

In April 2012, Brown took a six-month break from the show to write her memoirs. Dot temporarily departed on 18 May 2012. She returned on 14 January 2013. In February 2015, Dot began appearing less frequently due to Brown gradually losing her eyesight; this aspect of her life was written into her character the following year. In February 2020, Brown announced that her appearance in the previous month would be the character's last, as she was dissatisfied with the storylines being given to her. Following Brown's death on 3 April 2022, the character’s off screen death was announced in the Queen Vic on 1 December 2022, following the character’s death the previous night.

Ernie MearsErnie Mears, portrayed by Ken Wynne, wooed Ethel Skinner (Gretchen Franklin) during the Second World War but after she married his good friend William Skinner (Ian Brimble), he disappeared from their lives. Many years later, Ernie confesses to Ethel that he fled because he feared that he would either go insane being around an unobtainable Ethel, or that they would do something to hurt William if their association had continued.

When Ian Beale (Adam Woodyatt) becomes interested in learning to box in July 1985, Ethel joins him on his first trip to the gym, as boxing is her favourite sport. Ian's boxing coach, a retired light heavyweight champion, turns out to be Ernie, who at first thinks Ethel was Ian's mother.

Upon learning that it is Ethel and that she is now widowed, Ernie asks her on a date and a few weeks later asks her to marry him. However, the offer is conditional. Ernie is allergic to dogs and Willy the pug, Ethel's constant companion for the past 9 years, would have to go. Ethel seriously considers Ernie's offer but gently declines, after which Ernie departs broken hearted again. His last appearance is on 15 August 1985.

Martin FowlerMartin Fowler, played by Jon Peyton Price from 1985 to 1996, James Alexandrou from 1996 to 2007 and James Bye since 2014, is the younger son of Pauline Fowler (Wendy Richard) and Arthur Fowler (Bill Treacher), born in July 1985. His considerably older siblings are Mark Fowler (David Scarboro and later Todd Carty) and Michelle Fowler (Susan Tully and Jenna Russell). Martin is the first baby to be born in the serial. His grandmother Lou (Anna Wing) is extremely fond of him, and insists that he is named after her late husband Albert. Pauline and Arthur are against this, and for several months the baby remains unnamed, although Lou continues to refer to him as Albert. The baby's name is finally revealed as Martin Albert Fowler at his christening in October 1985, which satisfies Lou. Martin grows up facing numerous family upsets, including his father's mental breakdown and imprisonment and his parents' temporary separation in 1993, which Martin takes badly. As Martin ages he becomes surly and increasingly troublesome.

Detective Sergeant QuickDetective Sergeant Roy Quick, played by Douglas Fielding, is a police detective who appears in 51 episodes from episode 53, first shown on 20 August 1985, to episode 146, originally broadcast on 10 July 1986.

He arrives in Albert Square to put his old adversary, Nick Cotton (John Altman), in prison. He fails at this, but finds the woman he wants to marry, Debbie Wilkins (Shirley Cheriton), who is seeing Andy O'Brien (Ross Davidson) in an open relationship. Quick tries to woo Debbie, sending her bouquets of flowers. Andy becomes jealous of their friendship and tries to make them feel as uncomfortable as possible.

After a few months of platonic dating, Quick asks Debbie to marry him. Wanting to stay independent, Debbie turns him down, but Quick continues to pester her, saying that if he was married, it would improve his career. Eventually, Debbie ends the relationship and reunites with Andy. Quick then investigates a burglary at Dr Legg's (Leonard Fenton) surgery, for which he blames the victim for leaving a window open, and he angers the locals when he appears to be accusing innocent people, especially teenagers, of taking drugs. Debbie's rejection adds to Quick's dissatisfaction with the course his life has taken. He feels he is in a dead-end career with the police force and so he decides to leave to work for a security firm. Dr Legg then questions Quick's priorities, pointing out that the crime rate never went down since he arrived, so Quick accuses them of not helping the police, and his parting remarks to the citizenry in The Queen Victoria pub are, "You lot deserve each other, and you deserve what you've got, and what you've got is only the start!" His last appearance is in July 1986.

Simon WicksSimon Wicks, generally known as Wicksy, played by Nick Berry, appears between 1985 and 1990. Wicksy was introduced to take on some of the more adult storylines that had been scripted for another character, Mark Fowler; Mark's actor David Scarboro had left the serial prematurely due to personal problems. Wicksy was the soap's first male pin-up, and proved extremely popular with female fans. An early storyline sees Wicksy perform a song in the serial, "Every Loser Wins", which was subsequently released as a single in 1986 and reached number one in the UK singles chart. One of Wicksy's most prominent storylines is Cindy Beale's (Michelle Collins) adultery with him, and a subsequent feud with Cindy's husband Ian (Adam Woodyatt). Nick Berry quit the role in 1990, fearful of typecasting, and after five years on-screen, Wicksy departed in December that year.

Sheena MennellSheena Mennell, played by Dulice Liecier, first appears on 15 October 1985 when her taxicab breaks down in Bridge Street and she wanders into the café and asks Sue Osman (Sandy Ratcliff) where she might find another one. Sue tells her that her husband, Ali (Nejdet Salih), might be able to take her where she needs to go and so Mary Smith (Linda Davidson), who is in the café at the time, offers to show her the way to Number 23 Albert Square in search of Ali.

When Ali cannot be found, Mary invites Sheena to wait in her flat above and they quickly become friends. Sheena had once been in a similar situation to Mary when she found herself pregnant and alone, although she opted to abort the baby, which she had always regretted. Mary is impressed that Sheena earned £150 per week as a stripper. Weary of trying to live on the DSS payments she receives, Mary eagerly accepts Sheena's offer to help her find work as a stripper. Sheena also gives Mary dancing lessons.

Whilst out working, Mary leaves her daughter, Annie, in Sheena's care, but she is caught by Sue 'entertaining' a man in Mary's room with Annie in close proximity. Sheena then leaves Annie alone while she goes for a drink in The Queen Vic with her guest. When Mary finds out about Sheena's behaviour she calls her a "sluttish bitch" and tells her that Annie could end up in care because of her irresponsible actions. This is the last time Sheena was seen.

Guizin OsmanGuizin Osman, played by Ishia Bennison, is the long suffering wife of the philandering Turkish Cypriot, Mehmet Osman (Haluk Bilginer). She first arrives in Albert Square in October 1985 when she comes to inform her sister-in-law, Sue (Sandy Ratcliff), that her husband, Ali (Nejdet Salih), had gambled away the mortgage money for the home they were planning to buy.

Guizin and her three children, Emine (Pelin Ahmet), Rayif and Murat, later move in with her brother-in-law and his family in 1987, after her husband gambles away their home and deserts them. She works for Ali and Sue in the café for a few months until her husband returns and she becomes a partner in the business. As part owner of the café, she hires Ian Beale (Adam Woodyatt), who later becomes the sole owner.

Guizin and Mehmet's marriage is highly turbulent and they are always involved in intense arguments, mainly concerning money and gambling. Guizin is well aware of Mehmet's flaws and adultery, but unlike Sue, she is willing to turn a blind eye to most of her husband's dealings to keep the marriage together because, in her community, that's what a wife is expected to do. Guizin may put up with a lot from Mehmet, but she is certainly no pushover, and is more than willing to defend herself and her family if anyone should cross her. She has numerous rows with Sue over the years and she nearly comes to blows with Donna Ludlow (Matilda Ziegler) after she informs her that Mehmet had been trying to seduce her on New Year's Eve 1987. Yet more animosity arises when she discovers that Mehmet has been sleeping with prostitute Mary Smith (Linda Davidson), but although Guizin gets extremely angry, she ends up forgiving Mehmet for the sake of the family. However, there is one affair that Guizin is not willing to forgive Mehmet for, and it happens to be the only one that he did not actually have. After Sue discovers that Ali had slept with Donna Ludlow, she kisses Mehmet in front of Ali for revenge, causing a huge fight between the brothers. Ali tells Guizin about Sue and Mehmet's suspected affair, making Guizin furious. She viciously attacks Mehmet in the middle of the Square and leaves for Northern Cyprus, taking her children with her. Her last appearance is in March 1989. Mehmet leaves England soon after to attempt to patch up their relationship.

Bennison has "mixed memories" about her role in EastEnders, commenting in 2003: "it was the start of the soap and the fame was very instant for everybody. You're in everybody's front room and everyone feels they own a bit of you. I'll never forget having to sign people's sickbags on the hovercraft to France. My daughter wouldn't walk down the street with me at the time. She would stay 10 paces behind. I still get recognised from EastEnders. I can't believe it."

Cassie CarpenterCassie Carpenter, played by Delanie Forbes, made her first appearance on 14 November 1985. She is the daughter of Hannah Carpenter (Sally Sagoe) and Tony Carpenter (Oscar James) and the younger sister of Kelvin Carpenter (Paul J. Medford). In an early episode, before Cassie appears, she is referred to as being 14 years old, but when Cassie is introduced, she is 11 years old.

Cassie's parents are separated and she initially resides with her mother and her mother's new boyfriend, a corporate lawyer named Neville Agard (Gordon Case). Cassie first appears in November 1985 when she comes to visit her father in Albert Square. Cassie loves her father and finds her parents' separation difficult, particularly as she does not get on with Neville.

In April 1986, Hannah and Cassie arrive on Tony's doorstep with the disturbing news that Neville has been beating Cassie with a riding whip. After Tony fights with Neville, both Hannah and Cassie then come to live in Walford with Tony and Kelvin, and Cassie is delighted when her parents have decided to give their marriage another chance.

Cassie is a mischievous youngster who, like her brother, is bright. In May 1986 she gets into trouble with her school for bullying another girl, and is in even more trouble with her parents for trying to hide it from them. Tony later catches her smoking cannabis, which she has stolen from Owen Hughes (Philip Brook), a friend of Mark Fowler's (David Scarboro). Tony is furious and the Carpenters refuse to speak to any of the Fowler family because of it. After a subsequent meeting with Cassie's headmaster, Hannah decides that the only solution is to send Cassie away to boarding school. Cassie is against the idea but nevertheless, she is sent away in September that year. A few weeks later the Carpenters hear news that Cassie has run away from school and is nowhere to be found. She is discovered the following day, stealing food from Michelle Fowler (Susan Tully) and Lofty Holloway's (Tom Watt) kitchen in Albert Square, and returns to the school.

Cassie appears infrequently after this, and plays a Herald Angel in the Walford Nativity play on Christmas Eve 1986 and the following day when she, Kelvin and his friends play charades. This is her last appearance, but after her parents attempt at a reconciliation fails, Hannah leaves Walford and Cassie goes to live with her. Tony visits her occasionally, before leaving Walford, too, in 1987.

WinstonWinston' is an extra character who is portrayed by Ulric Browne, with his first on-screen appearance being in episode 81, originally shown on 26 November 1985. However, he is not credited for his role until later on in the series. His first line is "Bloody pedestrians", said to Den Watts (Leslie Grantham), who gets in Winston's way when he is riding a bicycle. Winston owns the music stall in Walford's Bridge Street Market, and over the years he proves to be a great friend to his fellow long-standing stall-holder, Mark Fowler (Todd Carty). His highlights include shaving his tuft of hair off for charity and helping Ethel Skinner (Gretchen Franklin) arrive at her birthday party on the night she dies. He is angry when Ian Beale's (Adam Woodyatt) car crashes into his stall in October 2006.

Winston is always willing to help when other market traders are called away, for example, to appear in a key development of a current plot, for example when Stacey Slater (Lacey Turner) needs someone to guard her clothing stall while she and Max Branning (Jake Wood) slip into an unguarded bedroom to continue the next episode in their illicit affair. Winston generally appears at events held by other Walford residents, such as weddings, funerals and parties or briefly in the background of a scene. He attends the funerals of Pauline Fowler (Wendy Richard), Pat Evans (Pam St Clement) and Archie Mitchell (Larry Lamb), stag parties for Garry Hobbs (Ricky Groves), Lucas Johnson (Don Gilet) and Ricky Butcher (Sid Owen), Jean Slater's (Gillian Wright) birthday party and Ricky and Bianca Jackson's (Patsy Palmer) wedding. Sometimes characters steal DVDs or CDs from his stall, including Jay Brown (Jamie Borthwick).

In April 2008, Winston's niece Keisha (Suzie McGrath) arrives in Walford, and leaves a month later with Gus Smith (Mohammed George). Winston wins a Children in Need raffle in The Queen Victoria in November 2008, and in July 2009, Stacey Slater offers him a flower but he refuses. He also appears with Shirley Carter (Linda Henry) getting drunk in Ian's chip shop in June 2009 and is seen drunk again in August 2009. He is seen with Tracey (Jane Slaughter) in August 2009 talking about Max and Tanya Branning (Jo Joyner), and in November 2009 Ian invites him for drinks at The Queen Vic but he refuses.

On 15 June 2010, Winston has a speaking role as he is seen engaging in a minor conversation with Max. On 2 November 2010, he has another minor speaking role asking for 3 drinks at the newly reopened Queen Vic. In April 2011, during the screening of the wedding of Prince William and Kate Middleton in The Queen Vic, Winston accidentally rips the cord from the television electrical plug, much to the dismay of the patrons. In January 2012, Winston is distracted by Kim Fox (Tameka Empson) in a bright outfit and accidentally knocks over a ladder, which nearly hits her. In May 2012, Lauren Branning (Jacqueline Jossa) buys a CD from Winston for her mother Tanya. However, Lauren's grandmother Cora Cross (Ann Mitchell) misinterprets the exchange and believes that Lauren is buying alcohol from Winston. In July 2012, Winston is chosen as the defender in The Queen Vic's football team. In August 2013, he locks market inspector Tamwar Masood (Himesh Patel) in a portable toilet as a joke, but Bianca and Kat Moon (Jessie Wallace) are blamed. He has another speaking role in April 2014 when he asks Alfie Moon (Shane Richie) for a black armband, as a mark of respect for the recently deceased Lucy Beale (Hetti Bywater) (see Who Killed Lucy Beale?).

Other characters

References

1985
, EastEnders
EastEnders